Thicketty (also spelled Thickety) is an unincorporated community in Cherokee County, South Carolina, United States. It lies between Gaffney and Cowpens along U.S. Route 29.

History
A post office called Thickety was established in 1837. The community took its name from nearby Thicketty Mountain.

References

Unincorporated communities in South Carolina
Unincorporated communities in Cherokee County, South Carolina